is a Japanese football player. He plays for Blaublitz Akita.

Career
Kaito Chida joined J3 League club Blaublitz Akita in 2017.

Club statistics
Updated to 1 December 2022.

Honours
 Blaublitz Akita
 J3 League (2): 2017, 2020

Individual
 Milk Soccer Academy Data Awards 2020 J3 Best Defender

References

External links

Profile at Blaublitz Akita
Profile at Kanagawa University

1994 births
Living people
Kanagawa University alumni
Association football people from Miyagi Prefecture
Japanese footballers
J3 League players
Blaublitz Akita players
Association football defenders